1st Air Division (1. Flieger-Division) was one of the primary divisions of the German Luftwaffe in World War II.

Commanding officers
Oberst Hugo Sperrle, 1 April 1934
Generalleutnant Ulrich Grauert, 1 July 1938 – 24 October 1939
General Martin Fiebig, 12 April 1942 
General Alfred Schlemm, 1 July 1942 
Generalleutnant Hermann Plocher, 1 October 1942 – 31 October 1942
General Alfred Bülowius, 1 November 1942 
Generalmajor Otto Zech, 17 January 1943 
General Paul Deichmann, 26 June 1943 
Generalmajor Robert Fuchs, 7 November 1943

References

Air divisions of the Wehrmacht Luftwaffe
Military units and formations established in 1934
Military units and formations disestablished in 1943